Guyancourt is a commune in the Yvelines department in the Île-de-France region in north-central France. It is located in the south-western suburbs of Paris,  from the center of Paris, in the "new town" of Saint-Quentin-en-Yvelines.

Geography
The commune of Guyancourt comprises several districts.
The first of them, corresponding to the old village, is known as
"le village", the others are named:
 Bouviers (Herdsmen), ancient hamlet of the village
 Les Garennes (the warrens)
 L'Europe (Europe)
 Le Pont du Routoir (the bridge over the retting pit)
 Les Saules (the Willows)
 Le Parc (the Park)
 Les Chênes (the Oaks)
 Villaroy (the recently constructed districts of the city)

The bordering communes are Versailles to the northeast, Voisins-le-Bretonneux to the southwest, Montigny-le-Bretonneux to the west, Châteaufort to the southeast, Magny-les-Hameaux to the south and Saint-Cyr-l'Ecole in the northwest.

Although located in the Paris suburbs (in an Anglo-Saxon conception of suburbs), more than half of the territory of the commune of Guyancourt is covered in natural spaces: forests, wood, parks, gardens and ponds.

History

Prehistoric
The site of the city was already inhabited by Neolithic tribes who left hundreds of vestiges such as arrows, flint scrapers, polished axes... which have been recovered in the districts of Bouviers, Troux and Villaroy.

Antiquity
The civilization continued through Roman times, as Mr. Leclère, a farmer, demonstrated in a fortuitous way in 1892 by unearthing an antique ballot box in his field.

The religious life
Work to restore the church Saint-Victor put the date of the sarcophages at the Merovingian era (from the seventh century).  It is believed that the construction of the first church dates from the fourteenth century.  Several funerary vases and a tomb stone
dating from the sixteenth century were updated.  The church was renovated in the fifteenth century, then entirely rebuilt in the sixteenth century.  The most recent restoration goes back to 1998.

Guyancourt and the Palace of Versailles
Guyancourt forms part of the "Grand Parc" of the sun king Soleil (Louis XIV), which extended around the castle of Versailles.  The essential vocation of the populous communes neighbouring the castle is market-gardening, to provide for the important needs for the Court.

French revolution
Thanks to the register of grievances sent to the governmental authorities (1789), we know that Guyancourtois, who were mostly modest peasants, lived with difficulty under conditions of famine.

The Franco-Prussian War of 1870
France is partly occupied by the Prussian armies. The enemy spreads terror, the houses are plundered, the inhabitants maltreated.  Four hundred of them (an enormous figure for the time) prefer to flee.

The 1900s
At the beginning of the twentieth century, Guyancourt was a large village where one cultivates corn, oats, beets, fodder and potatoes. The trades were numerous, with almost 16 wine merchants for 614 inhabitants.

The war of 1914–1918 cost the lives of thirty-six Guyancourtois. The war of 1939–1945 also touched Guyancourt, which was liberated by August 25, 1944.

The end of the twentieth century
Starting from the beginning of the 1950s, the Paris area saw a considerable demographic growth. To structure the development of the suburbs, it was decided to create several new towns around Paris, one of which being Saint-Quentin-en-Yvelines. The new city of Saint-Quentin-en-Yvelines includes today seven communes (eleven in the beginning), one of which is Guyancourt. In 1950 Guyancourt was only one small village. The commune grew  since 1970 to reach the figure of 27,000 inhabitants in 2004.

Population

Culture

International relations

Guyancourt is twinned with:
  Linlithgow, Scotland, United Kingdom, the birthplace of Mary, Queen of Scots
  Pegnitz, Germany

Notable people
 : Poet, writer, lampoonist, storyteller, lyric writer, novelist, local councillor and départemental.  The author of about thirty works, he also assumed several mandates of mayor, advising general, and President of the urban community (then called the SAN, trade union of new agglomeration).

Economy

Industrial fabric
Guyancourt accommodates not only many SME and trade, but also several large companies, such as:
 Le Technocentre Renault (automobile)
 The head office of Bouygues Construction
 At one time parent company Bouygues had its head office in the Kevin Roche-designed Challenger complex.
 The national case of Crédit Agricole
 The registered office of McDonald's, France
 Prost Grand Prix (closed now).

Education

Higher education and research
 Guyancourt is home to a campus of the University of Versailles-Saint-Quentin. The buildings located in the commune relate to the lessons on human rights and the social sciences.
 One also finds there research laboratories of the INRA (National Institute of Agronomic Research)

Primary and secondary schools
Junior high schools:
Collège Ariane
Collège Les Saules
Collège Paul-Eluard

Senior high schools:
Lycée Polyvalent Descartes
Lycée de Villaroy
Lycée Émilie-de Breteuil

Transportation
Guyancourt is served by no station of the Paris Métro, RER, or suburban rail network. The closest station to Guyancourt is Saint-Quentin-en-Yvelines–Montigny-le-Bretonneux station on Paris RER line C, on the Transilien La Défense suburban rail line, and on the Transilien Paris-Montparnasse suburban rail line. This station is located in the neighboring commune of Montigny-le-Bretonneux,  from the town center of Guyancourt.

See also

Communes of the Yvelines department

References

External links

 Ville of Guyancourt, official site
 Site of the district of Villaroy
 New city of Saint-Quentin-en-Yvelines

Communes of Yvelines
Saint-Quentin-en-Yvelines